Byatt is a surname. Notable people with the surname include:

A. S. Byatt, DBE (born 1936), English novelist, poet and Booker Prize winner
Andy Byatt, English wildlife documentary film producer for the BBC Natural History Unit (NHU) in Bristol
Dennis Byatt (born 1958), English former football central defender born in Hillingdon
Horace Byatt (1875–1933), British colonial governor
Ian Byatt (born 1935), British economist and first director general of Ofwat
Sharon Byatt, British based actress born in Liverpool, who played Irenee in Carla Lane's Bread

See also
22724 Byatt (provisional designation: 1998 SE59), an outer main-belt minor planet